The 2012–13 Illinois State Redbirds men's basketball team represented Illinois State University during the 2012–13 NCAA Division I men's basketball season. The Redbirds, led by first-year head coach Dan Muller, played their home games at Redbird Arena in Normal, Illinois as a member of the Missouri Valley Conference. They finished the season 18–15, 8–10 in conference play, to finish in sixth place. As the number six seed in the MVC tournament, they defeated Northern Iowa in a quarterfinal game before losing to Wichita State in a semifinal game.

Roster

Schedule and results

|-
!colspan=9 style=|Exhibition Season

|-
!colspan=9 style=|Regular Season

|-
!colspan=9 style=|State FarmMissouri Valley Conference {MVC} Tournament
|-

|-

Source

References

Illinois State Redbirds men's basketball seasons
Illinois State Redbirds men's basketball
Illinois State Redbirds men's basketball
Illinois State Redbirds